The Stevenage Strikers were a minor league ice hockey team based in Stevenage, Hertfordshire, England. The Stevenage Strikers played English League 3 – Central 1989/90; English League 3 – South 1990/91; English Conference National Division 1991/92; English Conference South 1992/3. Home games were played at the Stevenage Ice Bowl and their colors were red, white and blue.

Other Stevenage teams include the Stevenage Sharks (1992–93) and the Stevenage Oilers (1995–97).

Known players & coaches
John Baxter Coach (1989–90) Peter Ravenscroft Coach (1989–90) Mark Locks (Unknown) Ian (catnip) Francis  defense (1989-90) Lennox mccatty forward(1989–90) Roy (Cookie) Cooke (1989–90) Chris Lowden (Unknown) Paul Smith Left Wing & Captain (1989–91) Joe Flores (1989–92) Ben Ross Right Wing (1991-94) Jahan Mayer (1989–92) Jonathan Mayer Netminder (1989–92) Mike Boudreau (USA) Player-Coach David Greengrass Netminder  (1989–92) Daniel Seeley (1989–92) Steve Flecknell (1990–92) Scot Baxter Defense (1989–92) Gareth Davies Netminder (1989–1991) Rob Lingwood (1989–92) Phil Montague (1989–92) Dean Butt Scott Walker Right Wing 
(1989-91) (1989–91) Alf East player coach (1989–92) Gary East (1989–92) Mark Preston (1989–90)Nathan-Lee Ambrose' (1990–1991)
'Sport in Hertfordshire
Defunct ice hockey teams in the United Kingdom
Ice hockey teams in England
Stevenage''